Farwell may refer to:

Places
In the United States:
 Farwell, Michigan
 Farwell, Minnesota
 Farwell, Nebraska
 Farwell, Pennsylvania
 Farwell, Texas

Other uses
 Farwell (surname)

See also
 Adams-Farwell